Cabdulle Kudaad is a town in the central Hiran region of Somalia.

References
Cabdulle Kudaad

Populated places in Hiran, Somalia